Anbariv also known as Anbumani and Arivumani is an Indian duo of action choreographers and stunt coordinators who work in primarily in Tamil, Telugu, Malayalam, Kannada and Hindi cinema. The duo is well known for their action sequences in films such as Madras (2014), Kabali (2016), and K.G.F: Chapter 1 (2018). Anbariv won the National Film Award for Best Stunt Choreographer in 2019 for their work in 2018 box office hit Kannada film K.G.F: Chapter 1.

Biography 
Anbumani, also known as Anbu, and Arivumani or Arivu, were born as twins and were raised up in Puzhal.

Career 
Both of them pursued their careers as stunt choreographers in film industry. It was Anbu who joined the film industry initially before his twin brother Arivu. Both of them initially served as training assistants to some of the leading stunt masters in the Indian film industry including Stun Siva, Peter Hein, Vijayan, Kecha Khamphakdee, Silva and Dinesh Subbarayan. 

The duo debuted in Kollywood as assistant stunt directors in the 2010 film Naan Mahaan Alla before becoming prominent full fledged stunt choreographers in Indian cinema. They made their full fledged debut as stunt masters in Idharkuthane Aasaipattai Balakumara, In 2014 their work in the critically acclaimed film Madras which is based on street football earned them lot of appreciation and accolades. Their performance also raised spotlight and attention on them earning them nominations at the 4th South Indian International Movie Awards and in the 9th Vijay Awards for Best Stunt Director. Since then, the twin brothers have worked together in about 100 films in various languages such as Tamil, Telugu, Malayalam, Kannada and Hindi.

In 2018, the duo was suspended from the South Indian Cine and TV Stunt Artistes Union for allegations on violating the union rules and code of ethics regarding the stunt sequences and action performances. The court granted relief to the duo and allowed to rejoin the union.

Anbariv received the National Award for K.G.F: Chapter 1 as the Best Stunt Choreographer at the 66th National Film Awards which was held in August 2019.

Notable filmography

References 

Living people
Indian action choreographers
Indian stunt performers
Sibling duos
Year of birth missing (living people)
Place of birth missing (living people)